Ernst Max Pietschmann (born August 6, 1865, in Dresden; died April 16, 1952 in Niederpoyritz, Dresden) was a German Symbolist painter.

Life
Max Pietschmann studied at the Dresden Academy of Fine Arts from 1883 to 1889. His teachers included Leon Pohle and Ferdinand Pauwels. Pietschmann belonged to the painters' colony in Goppeln near Bannewitz, which specialized in plein air painting. He spent two years in Italy with Hans Unger, after which he continued his studies at the Académie Julian in Paris, where he was mainly engaged in nude drawing. His 3.8-meter × 2.6-meter sea painting Polyphemus' Fish Catch was exhibited in Dresden in 1892, where Pietschmann was praised as a "bright painter of the latest Parisian school," as well as at the World's Columbian Exposition in Chicago in 1893. He received an award at the 1900 World's Fair in Paris. He then settled back in Dresden, owning an apartment and studio in the Artists' House in Loschwitz from 1898 to 1904, where he joined the Visual Artists' Association of Dresden, the first Dresden Secession movement at the turn of the century.

In Niederpoyritz he had a studio house built in the "Italian style" and lived there from 1904 to 1952. In 1909 he was appointed professor at the Dresden Academy of Fine Arts. Pietschmann, who was in the tradition of artists such as Max Klinger and Arnold Böcklin and had a similar repertoire, was not influenced by the Expressionist art movement that emerged around the time of World War I nor by the New Objectivity movement of the 1920s. With fellow Symbolists Oskar Zwintscher, Richard Müller, Hans Unger, and Sascha Schneider, Pietschmann formed a "‘phalanx of the strong’ that signified Dresden's art at the turn of the century."

Under the pseudonym "Fr. (Francois) Laubnitz" he painted pictures that were very popular as mural prints in the first half of the 20th century.

Pietschmann died in 1952 in Niederpoyritz and was buried in the Hosterwitz Cemetery in Dresden.

Large parts of Pietschmann's artistic and written estate are in the archives of the Dresden State Art Collections.

Works (selected)

 Polyphemus' Fish Catch (panel painting, oil; 1892; awarded a medal at the 1893 Columbian World Exposition in Chicago)
 Prince Bismarck in Dresden on June 18, 1892 (panel painting, oil; 1895; in the holdings of the Dresden City Museum)
 Portrait of Adolf Rothermundt (panel painting, oil; 1897; in the holdings of the Dresden Gemäldegalerie Neue Meister)
 Bathers in the Forest Pond in the Evening (panel painting, oil; 1898; in the holdings of the Dresden Gemäldegalerie Neue Meister)

Exhibitions (selected)

1893: World's Columbian Exposition, shown: Polyphemus' Fish Catch
1896: Berlin International Art Exhibition, shown: Adam and Eve. Moonrise. Portrait study.
1896: "Hand Drawings by German Artists", September 20 - October 31, 1896, Arnold Gallery, Dresden.
1899: German Art Exhibition Dresden
1900: 32nd Great Painting Exhibition of the Art Association in Bremen, Kunsthalle Bremen
1901: Great Berlin Art Exhibition
1903: 71st exhibition of the Hanover Art Association
1903: Great Berlin Art Exhibition
1903: Saxon Art Exhibition Dresden
1904: Great Art Exhibition Dresden, shown: The Bath. Adam and Eve.
1906: Great Berlin Art Exhibition
1908: Great Art Exhibition Dresden
1908: Munich Annual Exhibition, shown: Joseph and Mary. Spring Idyll. Mountain Water.
1910: Great Berlin Art Exhibition
1910: Exhibition of the Green-White Group at the Emil Richter Art Salon in Dresden, shown: Mountain Water.  At the Water. From My Window.
1911: Hamburg Art Association, collective exhibition of the Dresden branch of the German Art Association
1912: "Places of Work", March 15 - mid-April 1912, Arnold Gallery, Dresden
1913: Eleventh International Art Exhibition in the Royal Glass Palace, Munich, showing: Seated Female Nude from Behind. Bathers. Model at Rest.
1914: First International Graphic Art Exhibition, Leipzig
1914: Biennale di Venezia
1914: Great Berlin Art Exhibition
1916: Exhibition of the Artists' Guild Berlin, August 3 - September 30, 1916, Nassau Art Association, Wiesbaden
1917: Franz Marc Memorial Exhibition, February 1 - April 1, 1917, Nassau Art Association, Wiesbaden
1925: "Inexpensive Graphics of the Graphic Cabinet", Arnold Gallery, Dresden
1933: "Portrait Exhibition of Dresden Artists, Graphic Cabinet", June 22 - July 25, 1933, Dresden Castle
1934: Saxon Art Exhibition Dresden
1996: Vineyard Church, Dresden-Pillnitz
1999/2000: Dresden Gemäldegalerie Neue Meister

Bibliography

 Ruth Negendanck. Die Galerie Ernst Arnold (1893–1951). Kunsthandel und Zeitgeschichte. Weimar: Verlag und Datenbank für Geisteswissenschaften, 1998. .
 "Pietschmann, Max (Ernst M.)". In: Hans Vollmer (ed.), Allgemeines Lexikon der Bildenden Künstler von der Antike bis zur Gegenwart. Begründet von Ulrich Thieme und Felix Becker, vol. 27: Piermaria–Ramsdell. Leipzig: E. A. Seemann, 1933, p. 30.

References

1865 births
1952 deaths
People from Dresden
People from the Kingdom of Saxony
19th-century German painters
19th-century German male artists
German male painters
German Symbolist painters
Art Nouveau painters
20th-century German painters
20th-century German male artists
Académie Julian alumni